The Japan national badminton team represents Japan in international badminton team competitions. The Japanese women's team have won the Uber Cup 6 times, with their most recent being the 2018 Uber Cup. The men's team won their first Thomas Cup title in 2014. The mixed team were runners-up three times at the Sudirman Cup.

The Japanese badminton team has been prestigious in the Olympics, having won a gold medal in the 2016 Summer Olympics and a silver and 2 bronze medals.

Summer Olympic Games

List of medalists

Participation in BWF competitions

Thomas Cup

Uber Cup

Sudirman Cup

**Red border color indicates tournament was held on home soil.

Participation in Badminton Asia Team Championships

Men's team
{| class="wikitable"
|-
! Year !! Result
|-
| 2016 ||  Runner-up
|-
| 2018 || Quarter-finalist
|-
| 2020 ||  Semi-finalist
|-
| 2022 || Group stage
|}Women's teamMixed team'''

Squad
The following players were selected to represent Japan at the 2020 Thomas & Uber Cup.

Male players
Takuro Hoki
Yuki Kaneko
Yugo Kobayashi
Akira Koga
Kento Momota
Kodai Naraoka
Kenta Nishimoto
Taichi Saito
Kanta Tsuneyama
Koki Watanabe
Yuta Watanabe

Female players
Yuki Fukushima
Arisa Higashino
Mayu Matsumoto
Misaki Matsutomo
Nami Matsuyama
Aya Ohori
Nozomi Okuhara
Chiharu Shida
Asuka Takahashi
Sayaka Takahashi
Akane Yamaguchi

References

Badminton
National badminton teams
Badminton in Japan